German submarine U-418 was a Type VIIC U-boat of Nazi Germany's Kriegsmarine during World War II.

She carried out one patrol. She was a member of three wolfpacks. She did not sink or damage any ships.

She was sunk by a British aircraft in the Bay of Biscay on 30 May 1943.

Design
German Type VIIC submarines were preceded by the shorter Type VIIB submarines. U-418 had a displacement of  when at the surface and  while submerged. She had two shafts and two  propellers.

U-418 was fitted with five  torpedo tubes (four fitted at the bow and one at the stern), fourteen torpedoes, one  SK C/35 naval gun, 220 rounds, and two twin  C/30 anti-aircraft guns. The boat had a complement of between forty-four and sixty.

Service history
The submarine was laid down on 21 October 1941 at the Danziger Werft (yard) at Danzig (now Gdansk), as yard number 119, launched on 11 July 1942 and commissioned on 21 October under the command of Oberleutnant zur See Gerhard Lange.

She served with the 8th U-boat Flotilla from 21 October 1942 and the 1st flotilla from 1 May 1943.

Patrol and loss
U-418 left Kiel on 24 April 1943 and headed for the Atlantic Ocean via the gap between Iceland and the Faroe Islands. The boat was sunk by a British Catalina flying boat of No. 210 Squadron RAF on 30 May. Whole crew was killed.

Previously recorded fate
U-418 was sunk on 1 June 1943 by rockets from a British Bristol Beaufighter of 236 Squadron in the western Bay of Biscay.

Wolfpacks
U-418 took part in three wolfpacks, namely:
 Without name (5 – 10 May 1943) 
 Isar (10 – 15 May 1943) 
 Donau 1 (15 – 23 May 1943)

References

Bibliography

External links

German Type VIIC submarines
U-boats commissioned in 1942
U-boats sunk in 1943
U-boats sunk by British aircraft
1942 ships
Ships built in Danzig
Ships lost with all hands
World War II submarines of Germany
World War II shipwrecks in the Atlantic Ocean
Maritime incidents in June 1943